FabricLive.02 is a DJ mix compilation album by Ali B, as part of the FabricLive Mix Series.

Track listing

External links
Fabric: FabricLive.02
Allmusic: [ FabricLive.02]

2002 compilation albums